Balthasar Bickel (born December 19, 1965) is a Swiss linguist. Bickel is a specialist in linguistic typology and on Tibeto-Burman languages, especially languages of the Kiranti group.

He is currently a professor at the Department of Comparative Language Science at the University of Zurich. Between 2002 and 2011, he taught at the Leipzig University in Germany. He received his graduate training at the Max Planck Institute for Psycholinguistics in Nijmegen and earned his doctoral degree from the University of Zurich. As a postdoctoral researcher, he spent several years at the University of California, Berkeley, where he became a close collaborator of Johanna Nichols.

Bickel has made contributions to the study of tense and aspect, grammatical agreement and grammatical relations, morphological typology, phonological word domains, areal typology, linguistic relativity, and more recently to quantitative methods in language typology. He has done extensive fieldwork on a number of Kiranti languages of Nepal, especially Belhare, Chintang and Puma. He is co-editor of the journal Studies in Language.

Partial bibliography
 "Aspect, mood, and time in Belhare." Zürich: ASAS. (1996)
 "On the syntax of agreement in Tibeto-Burman." Studies in Language 24, 583 – 609 (2000)
 Belhare. In Thurgood, G. & R. J. LaPolla (eds.) The Sino-Tibetan languages, 546 – 70. London: Routledge (2003)
 "Referential density in discourse and syntactic typology." Language 79, 708 – 736 (2003)
 (with Johanna Nichols) "Inflectional synthesis of the verb." In Haspelmath, M., M. S. Dryer, D. Gil, & B. Comrie (eds.) The world atlas of language structures, 94 – 97. Oxford: Oxford University Press. (2005/2008) online
 "Typology in the 21st century: major current developments." Linguistic Typology 11, 239 – 251 (2007)
 "Grammatical relations typology." In Song, J. J. (ed.) The Oxford Handbook of Language Typology, pp. 399 – 444, Oxford: Oxford University Press (2011)

External links
Homepage at the University of Zurich

1965 births
Living people
Linguists from Switzerland
University of Zurich alumni